Jack Lynn (born August 6, 1993) is a former American football linebacker. He played college football at Minnesota.

Professional career
Lynn signed with the Atlanta Falcons as an undrafted free agent on June 6, 2017. He was waived on September 1, 2017.

References

External links
Minnesota Golden Gophers bio

1993 births
Living people
American football linebackers
Minnesota Golden Gophers football players
Atlanta Falcons players